Giovanny Gallegos (born August 14, 1991) is a Mexican professional baseball pitcher for the St. Louis Cardinals of Major League Baseball (MLB). He made his MLB debut in 2017 with the New York Yankees and also pitched for them in 2018 before being traded to the Cardinals.

Career

New York Yankees
Gallegos signed with the New York Yankees as an international free agent in 2012. He made his professional debut that same year with the Gulf Coast League Yankees, compiling a 0–1 record with a 1.67 ERA in 27 innings pitched. In 2013, he pitched for the Staten Island Yankees where he was 2–8 with a 4.27 ERA in 16 starts, and in 2014, he played with the Charleston RiverDogs where he pitched to a 5–5 record and a 4.57 ERA in 29 games, mainly in relief. Gallegos spent a majority of 2015 with the Tampa Yankees, going 3–1 with a 1.35 ERA in 30 relief appearances, along with pitching in three games for the Trenton Thunder and two with the Scranton/Wilkes-Barre RailRiders. He spent 2016 with both Trenton and Scranton/Wilkes-Barre, compiling a combined 7–2 record and 1.27 ERA in 42 combined relief appearances between both teams. The Yankees added Gallegos to their 40-man roster after the 2016 season.

Gallegos played for the Mexico national baseball team in the 2017 World Baseball Classic.

Gallegos began 2017 with the RailRiders. The Yankees promoted Gallegos to the major leagues on May 11, 2017. He made his major league debut the next day. He spent the 2017 season between the two clubs, compiling a 4–2 record and 2.08 ERA in 28 relief appearances for Scranton/Wilkes-Barre, and a 0–1 record with a 4.87 ERA in 16 relief appearances for New York. He began 2018 with the RailRiders.

St. Louis Cardinals
On July 27, 2018, the Yankees traded Gallegos and Chasen Shreve to the St. Louis Cardinals for Luke Voit and bonus pool money. The Cardinals assigned him to the Memphis Redbirds, and spent the remainder of the year there before being promoted to St. Louis in late September. Gallegos began 2019 with Memphis. He was recalled to St. Louis on April 7. On April 11, Gallegos won his first career MLB game against the Los Angeles Dodgers pitching  innings as a relief pitcher. He was optioned back to Memphis on April 15, but recalled the next day, ultimately spending the remainder of the year in St. Louis.

Over 66 relief appearances during the 2019 regular season, Gallegos went 3–2 with a 2.31 ERA, striking out 93 over 74 innings. In a shortened 2020 season, Gallegos missed time after testing positive for COVID-19 and a groin injury, and pitched only 15 innings during the year, going 2–2 with a 3.60 ERA. Gallegos was a key member of the Cardinals' bullpen in 2021 and moved into the closer role in late August, finishing the season appearing in 73 games in which he went 6-5 with a 3.02 ERA, 95 strikeouts, and 14 saves over  relief innings pitched.

Gallegos finished the 2022 season having made 57 relief appearances in which he went 3–6 with a 3.05 ERA, 73 strikeouts, and 14 saves over 59 innings. On October 4, Gallegos and the Cardinals agreed to a two-year contract extension worth $11 million.

References

External links

1991 births
2017 World Baseball Classic players
2023 World Baseball Classic players
Baseball players from Sonora
Charleston RiverDogs players
Gulf Coast Yankees players
Living people
Major League Baseball pitchers
Major League Baseball players from Mexico
Mexican expatriate baseball players in the United States
New York Yankees players
Scranton/Wilkes-Barre RailRiders players
St. Louis Cardinals players
Staten Island Yankees players
Tampa Yankees players
Trenton Thunder players
Yaquis de Obregón players
Memphis Redbirds players
People from Ciudad Obregón